Äänekosken Huima (abbreviated Huima) is a sports club from Äänekoski, Finland. The club was formed in 1904 and is best known for its basketball team.
The men's football first team currently plays in the Third Division (Kolmonen).  Their home ground is the Center Field of Äänekoski (Äänekosken Keskuskenttä).

Background

Huima have played 6 seasons in the Ykkönen (First Division), the second tier of Finnish football in 1971 and 1983–87.  They also have had five spells covering 10 seasons in the third tier, the Kakkonen (Second Division), in 1982, 1988, 1997–2000, 2004–06 and 2008.

Season to season

Club structure

Äänekosken Huima run a number of teams including 1 men's team, 6 boys teams and 2 girls teams.

2012 season

Huima First Team are competing in the Kolmonen administered by the Itä-Suomi SPL and Keski-Suomi SPL.  This is the fourth highest tier in the Finnish football system.  In 2011 Huima finished in ninth position in their Kolmonen section.

Huima II are not running a team since the 2009 season.

References and sources
Official ClubWebsite
Football Club Website
Finnish Wikipedia
Suomen Cup

Footnotes

Football clubs in Finland
Basketball teams in Finland
Äänekoski
1904 establishments in Finland